The Dr. J. A. Reuter House is a historic house in The Dalles, Oregon, United States. John Alexander Reuter (1876–1954) practiced medicine in The Dalles for 44 years (1902–1946), joining a partnership that established the city's first hospital (1901) and nursing school, as well as a large private clinic (1937). He bought this house (originally built 1890) in 1909 and radically transformed it by jacking the old house up to become the second floor and building a new first floor beneath. He also completely remodeled it to become the city's finest example of the Craftsman style.

The house was added to the National Register of Historic Places in 1997.

See also
National Register of Historic Places listings in Wasco County, Oregon

References

External links

Houses completed in 1890
Houses completed in 1909
1890 establishments in Oregon
Houses in The Dalles, Oregon
National Register of Historic Places in Wasco County, Oregon
Houses on the National Register of Historic Places in Oregon
American Craftsman architecture in Oregon